Gary Smith is an avant-garde guitarist, improviser and composer from the United Kingdom. He is known for developing dense extended techniques on electric guitar. Gary Smith has released close to twenty albums in solo, group and live settings with Shoji Hano, Rhys Chatham, John Stevens, Hugh Hopper, Masayoshi Urabe, Chie Mukai, Aufgehoben No Process, and Bill Fay.

Selected discography
Gary Smith: Rhythm Guitar (Impetus) 1991 		
Gary Smith: Stereo (Chronoscope) 1996
Gary Smith & John Stevens: S/T (Ecstatic Peace) 1996
Gary Smith: Forgotten Room With Chairs (Fmr) 1998
Mass: Mass (Paratactile) 1998
Mass: From Zero (Paratactile) 1998
Powerfield: Electronic/Electric/Electronic (Paratactile) 1999
Glass Cage: Glass Cage (Paratactile) 2001
Aufgehoben No Process Vs Gary Smith: Magnetic Mountain (Junior Meat) 2001
Masayoshi Urabe & Gary Smith: S/T (Paratactile) 2001 		
Aufgehoben: Anno Fauve (Riot Season) 2004
Gary Smith: Future Thought Reveal 2003 (Paratactile) 2003
Mass: Mixed Media (Paratactile) 2003
Mukai Chie & Gary Smith: Eight+ (Paratactile) 2005
Bill Fay Group: Tomorrow Tomorrow and Tomorrow (Durtro) 2005
Gary Smith: Supertexture (Sijis) 2006

References

External links
Gary Smith in The Wire magazine

20th-century British guitarists
21st-century British guitarists
Free improvisation
English jazz guitarists
English male guitarists
English rock guitarists
Year of birth missing (living people)
Living people
20th-century British male musicians
21st-century British male musicians
British male jazz musicians
FMR Records artists
Ecstatic Peace! artists